Rafael da Silva Porto (born February 8, 1979 in Porto Alegre, Brazil) is a former soccer player, and current technical coordinator of the Miami Dade FC in the NAL.

Player
Porto played in his youth for Sport Club Internacional where he played from 1991 to 1993 and for Sport Club Internacional from Gremio where he played from 1993 to 1998.

Made his debut at the professional level for Brasil de Pelotas in the Campeonato Gaucho in 2000.

Coach
Porto began his football career outside the field as a scout for Gremio in 2001

Braga also had a spell with Ulbra, Brusque Futebol Clube and Santa Cruz as an (Assistant coach) before joining football giants Fluminense as a scout 2011 where he stayed for 2 years.

In May 2014, he was announced by Miami Dade FC in the NAL as a technical coordinator.

References
https://web.archive.org/web/20140602195925/http://www.natelado190.com.br/noticias_detail.php?id_noticia=9462

External links
 Miami Dade FC
 https://www.youtube.com/watch?v=x4cUDOOp0KQ
 https://web.archive.org/web/20140602195925/http://www.natelado190.com.br/noticias_detail.php?id_noticia=9462

1979 births
Living people
American soccer coaches
Association football defenders
Brazilian footballers
Footballers from Porto Alegre